The Ring Inz is a New Zealand comedy television show that premiered on 23 March 2017 on Māori Television. The show is about a Kapa Haka group who try and overcome their differences to put on the performance of a lifetime at the Kapa Haka Nationals. It has been described as Pitch Perfect meets Modern Family set on a marae.

Production 
The promo to the show was released in February 2017.
The show premiered on 23 March 2017.
The season finale aired on 4 May 2017.
The second season premiered on 6 September 2018.

References

2010s New Zealand television series
2017 New Zealand television series debuts
2019 New Zealand television series endings
Māori Television original programming
New Zealand comedy television series